The Chaldean Catholic Archeparchy (or Archdiocese) of Basra (or Bassorah) is a non-metropolitan Archeparchy (Eastern Catholic archdiocese) of the Chaldean Catholic Church (Syro-Oriental Rite, Syriac or Aramaic language) in southern Iraq.

It is subject to the Chaldean Catholic Patriarch of Babylon, without suffragan.

Its cathedral episcopal see Cathedral of Our Lady, is in Al Basrah.

History 
In 280 AD it was established as Diocese of Perat-Maishan (Perâth Maishân), which was promoted in 410 to the Metropolitan Archdiocese of Perat-Maishan. It was suppressed in 1200.

In 1860 it was nominally restored as Titular archbishopric of Perat-Maishan, and was again suppressed in 1895.

On 17 January 1954, it was fully restored as residential Chaldean Catholic Archeparchy of Basra (Bassorah), on territory split off from the Metropolitan Chaldean Catholic Archeparchy of Baghdad.

Episcopal ordinaries
(all Chaldean rite)

Ancient residential see of Perat-Maishan 
Eparchs (Bishops) of Perat-Maishan
 David (? – 285)
 Yohannan (315? – ?)

Metropolitan Archeparchs (Archbishops) of Perat-Maishan
 Milis (410? – ?)
 Zabda (? - 424 – ?)

Former titular Archdiocese of Perat-Maishan 
Titular Archeparchs (Archbishops) of Perat-Maishan
 Thomas Rokuss (1860 – 1885), no further office
 Jacques-Michel Naamo (1888.04.27 – death 1895), emeritate as former Bishop of Seert of the Chaldeans (1885.03.24 – 1888.04.27)

Modern residential see of Basra (Bassorah) 
 Archeparchs (Archbishops) of Basra (Bassorah)
 Joseph Gogué (1954.02.08 – death 1971.01.15)
 Gabriel Ganni (1971.01.15 – death 1981.11.10), succeeding as former Coadjutor Archeparch of Bassorah of the Chaldeans (1966.03.02 – 1971.01.15); previously Auxiliary Eparch of Beirut of the Chaldeans (Lebanon) (1956.03.19 – 1959) and Titular Bishop of Gargara (1956.03.19 – 1964.02.12), promoted Coadjutor Eparch of Beirut of the Chaldeans (1959 – 1964.02.12), succeeding as Bishop of Beirut of the Chaldeans (Lebanon) (1964.02.12 – 1966.03.02), then Titular Archbishop of Pessinus (1966.03.02 – 1971.01.15)
 Stéphane Katchou (1981.11.10 – 1983.11.29), succeeding as former  Coadjutor Archbishop of Bassorah of the Chaldeans (Iraq) (1980.10.03 – 1981.11.10) & Titular Archbishop of Anbar of the Chaldeans (1980.10.03 – 1981.11.10); later Archbishop-Bishop of Zaku of the Chaldeans (Iraq) (1983.11.29 – death 1987.11.08)
 Yousif Thomas (1983.11.29 – 1995.10.24)
 Djibrail Kassab (1995.10.24 – 2006.10.21), later Archbishop-Bishop of Saint Thomas the Apostle of Sydney of the Chaldeans (Australia) (2006.10.21 – 2015.01.15)
 Habib Hormuz Al-Naufali (2014.01.11 – ...)

See also 
Catholic Church in Iran
Chaldean Catholic Church

References

External links 
 GigaCatholic, with incumbent biography links

Christian organizations established in 1954
Chaldean Catholic dioceses
Eastern Catholic titular sees